Morafeno is the name of several municipalities in Madagascar:
 Morafeno, Befandriana-Nord, a municipality in Befandriana-Nord District, Sofia Region.
 Morafeno, Sambava, a municipality in Sambava District, Sava Region.
 Morafeno, Maevatanana, a municipality in Maevatanana District, Betsiboka Region.
 Morafeno, Maroantsetra, a municipality in Maroantsetra (district), Analanjirofo region.
 Morafeno, Ambohimahasoa, a municipality in the Ambohimahasoa District, Haute Matsiatra

Public Buildings
CHU Morafeno - the university hospital of  Toamasina, Madagascar.